James Conroyd Martin is an American historical fiction author and teacher.

Personal
Martin received his bachelor's degree from Saint Ambrose University and received a Master of Arts in English literature from DePaul University. A native of Chicago, Martin chaired the English Department at Marian Catholic High School in Chicago Heights, Illinois.  He has since retired and moved to Portland, OR, where he continues writing.

Although not of Polish descent, Martin has been praised by the Polish-American community for his Polish Trilogy and was honored in 2007 by the American Institute of Polish Culture and in 2008 by the Wisconsin Division of the Polish American Congress.

Bibliography
The Boy Who Wanted Wings (2016)
Hologram: A Haunting (2014)

Polish trilogy
Push not the River (2001)
Against a Crimson Sky (2006)
The Warsaw Conspiracy (2012)

References

External links
Interview with Martin
Martin on LibraryThing
Martin's Page on Historical Fiction Books
Martin's page on Macmillan

Living people
American historical novelists
American Roman Catholics
Writers from Chicago
DePaul University alumni
Year of birth missing (living people)
American male novelists
Novelists from Illinois
Educators from Illinois